Asleep Next to Science is the debut studio album by American progressive rock band Orbs. It was released on August 17, 2010, through Equal Vision Records and produced by Jamie King, known for producing Between the Buried and Me and Alesana.

Background 
Orbs entered the studio at The Basement recording studio in Winston-Salem, N.C. in February 2009. It was produced by Jamie King, who worked with Between the Buried and Me on Colors and The Great Misdirect. On April 4, 2010, the band released a free download of two songs from the album to fans who signed up to their mailing list.

The band describes the album as "the product of long-distance friendships linked through an appreciation for music, nature, and a mutual desire to defy common song structure."

A tour in support of the album began on August 19, 2010 in Greensboro, N.C.

Reception
The Allmusic review by Ned Raggett awarded the album 3 stars stating "Asleep Next to Science, the group's first full release, is both a familiar enough supergroup-styled effort thanks to the bandmembers' various backgrounds in acts like Between the Buried and Me and Abigail Williams and a modern version of it given that their work grew out of Internet-based collaboration. The album almost resists criticism in a way, though, because it is exactly all that -- come in expecting theatrical compositions, metal-tinged and emo-tinged and more besides, and you'll get it down to the concluding piano flourishes on 'Sayer of the Law,' not to mention plenty of keyboard breaks throughout courtesy of Ashley Ellyllon. The descending break and coda to 'Something Beautiful' show that the quintet can hit the epically melancholy heights with the best of them, and if such moments aren't always constant throughout the album, they happen enough times to set a good tone. Adam Fisher's vocals are the make-or-break point throughout -- there's something sweetly, strangely inspirational about hearing his thin, almost dorky whine riding the arrangements on songs like 'A Man of Science,' and a few times he makes it work unexpectedly, much like Billy Corgan did with his own out-of-place singing. At other points it's more hair-pulling, however, though song titles like 'Megaloblastic Madness' and the two-part 'The Northwestern Bearitories' might cause more double takes in the end -- or the line 'Chupacabras on the wing' in 'People Will Read Again.' "

Track listing

Personnel 
Orbs
Adam Fisher – vocals, electronic programming
Dan Briggs – guitar, bass
Ashley Ellyllon – keyboards, piano
Clayton Holyoak – drums, percussion
Chuck Johnson - Additional vocals on "We the Animal" and "Lost at Sea"

Production
Produced by Jamie King
Audio mixing by Jamie King
Illustration by Ben Tuttle

References 

2010 debut albums
Albums produced by Jamie King (record producer)